Henry Arthur Dobson (1 April 1893 – 29 March 1918) was an English professional footballer who played in the Football League for Aston Villa as a wing half.

Personal life 
In December 1915, with the First World War underway, Dobson attested under the Derby Scheme and spent over a year in the Army Reserve. He was transferred into the North Staffordshire Regiment in February 1918. Dobson was wounded during a retreat from Saint-Quentin in the early days of the German spring offensive and died on 29 March 1918. He was buried in Prémont British Cemetery.

Career statistics

References

External links 

 

1893 births
People from Chesterton, Staffordshire
English footballers
Aston Villa F.C. players
North Staffordshire Regiment soldiers
Association football wing halves
English Football League players
Rotherham County F.C. wartime guest players
British Army personnel of World War I
British military personnel killed in World War I
1918 deaths
Military personnel from Staffordshire